Sad Girl (stylized in letter case) is the debut extended play (EP) by American singer Sasha Alex Sloan. The EP was released by label RCA Records on April 18, 2018. Sad Girl features production collaborations with musicians such as King Henry, Lotus IV, and Martin Doherty of Scottish band Chvrches. The EP's lead single, "Ready Yet", was released on October 27, 2017.

Track listing

References

2018 debut EPs
Sasha Alex Sloan albums
RCA Records EPs
Albums produced by King Henry (producer)
Albums produced by Linus Wiklund